Cambarus monongalensis, the blue crayfish or Monongahela crayfish, is a species of burrowing crayfish native to Pennsylvania and West Virginia. It has also been found recently in Ohio. The common name refers to the Monongahela River, with the first specimens being collected from Edgewood Park, Allegheny County, Pennsylvania. It is included on the IUCN Red List as a species of Least Concern.

It should not be confused with Procambarus alleni, also known as the blue crayfish, which is endemic to Florida and a popular aquarium crustacean.

References

Cambaridae
Freshwater crustaceans of North America
Crustaceans described in 1905
Taxa named by Arnold Edward Ortmann